The following is a list of countries by pharmaceutical exports.

Global sales from exported drugs and medicines by country total US$371.3 billion in 2018. Overall the value of drugs and medicine exports grew by an average 5.80% for all exporting countries since 2014 when drugs and medicines shipments were valued at $344.1 billion. Year over year, there was a 7.9% uptick from 2017 to 2018.

Among continents, European countries sold the highest dollar value worth of exported drugs and medicines during 2018 with shipments from Europe totaling $295.8 billion or 79.70% of the global total. In second place were Asian pharmaceutical exporters at 10.70% while 8.10% of worldwide drugs and medicine shipments originated from North America.

Smaller percentages came from drugs and medicines suppliers in Latin America (0.7%) excluding Mexico but including the Caribbean, Oceania (0.5%) led by Australia and New Zealand, then Africa (0.2%).

The 4-digit Harmonized Tariff System code prefixes for drugs and medicines are:

 3003 for medicaments consisting of two or more constituents mixed together (4.3% of global total)
 3004 for medicaments consisting of mixed or unmixed products (95.7%)

2020
Below are the 15 countries that exported the highest dollar value worth of drugs and medicines during 2020.

 Germany: US$60.8 billion (14.9% of total exported drugs and medicines)
 Switzerland: $48.1 billion (11.8%)
 Belgium: $31.1 billion (7.6%)
 France: $28.4 billion (7%)
 Italy: $27.2 billion (6.7%)
 United States: $24.7 billion (6.1%)
 India: $24.6 billion (6.1%)
 Ireland: $23.1 billion (5.7%)
 Netherlands: $19.8 billion (4.9%)
 United Kingdom: $18.7 billion (4.6%)
 Denmark: $16.7 billion (4.1%)
 Spain: $10.9 billion (2.7%)
 Sweden: $8.9 billion (2.2%)
 Canada: $7.6 billion (1.9%)
 Slovenia: $7.3 billion (1.8%)

By value, the listed 15 countries shipped 85.9% of all exported drugs and medicine for 2020.

Among the above countries, the fastest-growing exporters of drugs and medicines from 2019 to 2020 were: Slovenia (up 42.2%), Ireland (up 28.8%), India (up 13.5%) and Italy (up 11.2%).

Those countries that posted the slowest gains year over year were: Switzerland (up 0.7%), Canada (up 1.6%), United Kingdom (up 1.6%), United States (up 1.8%) and Germany (up 6.5%).

2014
Data is for 2014, in billions of United States dollars, as reported by The Observatory of Economic Complexity. Currently the top ten countries are listed, which account for more than 75% of the total market value, estimated to be $US 354 billions.

Note: The total was calculated excluding the figures for individual member states (for this purpose these include the UK) in order to avoid double-counting.

References

External links
 Observatory of Economic complexity - Countries that export Packaged Medicaments (2014)'

Pharmaceutical